String Quartet No. 17 may refer to:

 String Quartet No. 17 (Hill) by Alfred Hill
 String Quartet No. 17 (Milhaud), Op. 307, by Darius Milhaud
 String Quartet No. 17 (Mozart) by Wolfgang Amadeus Mozart
 String Quartet No. 17 (Villa-Lobos) by Heitor Villa-Lobos